The New York Knickerbockers are an American professional basketball team based in New York City. They are a member of the Atlantic Division of the Eastern Conference in the National Basketball Association (NBA). They play their home games at Madison Square Garden. The franchise's official name "Knickerbockers" came from the style of pants Dutch settlers wore when they moved to America. Having joined the Basketball Association of America (BAA), the predecessor of the NBA, in 1946, the Knicks remain as one of the oldest teams in the NBA. During Red Holzman's tenure, the franchise won its only two NBA championships, the 1970 NBA Finals and the 1973 NBA Finals.

There have been 26 head coaches for the New York Knicks franchise. Holzman was the franchise's first Coach of the Year winner and is the team's all-time leader in regular season games coached, regular season games won, playoff games coached, and playoff games won. Holzman was inducted into the Basketball Hall of Fame in 1986 as a coach. Besides Holzman, Rick Pitino, Don Nelson, Pat Riley, Lenny Wilkens, and Larry Brown have been inducted into the Basketball Hall of Fame as coaches. Four coaches have been named to the list of the top 10 coaches in NBA history. Neil Cohalan, Joe Lapchick, Vince Boryla, Carl Braun, Eddie Donovan and Herb Williams have spent their entire coaching careers with the Knicks. Boryla, Braun, Harry Gallatin, Dick McGuire, Willis Reed and Williams formerly played for the Knicks.

Key

Coaches

Notes
 A running total of the number of coaches of the Knicks. Thus, any coach who has two or more separate terms as head coach is only counted once.
 Each year is linked to an article about that particular NBA season.

References
General

Specific

Lists of National Basketball Association head coaches by team

Head coaches